<noinclude>
Mor Hananyo Monastery (Monastery of Saint Ananias) is an important Syriac Orthodox monastery located three kilometers south east of Mardin, Turkey, in the Syriac cultural region known as Tur Abdin.

It is usually better known by its nickname, the "Saffron Monastery" which is derived from the warm color of its stone. Syriac Orthodox culture was centered in two monasteries near Mardin (west of Tur Abdin), Mor Gabriel and Deyrulzafaran.

History
The Mor Hananyo Monastery is located on the site of a temple dedicated to the Mesopotamian sun god Shamash, which was then converted into a citadel by the Romans. After the Romans withdrew from the fortress, Mor Shlemon transformed it into a monastery in 493 AD. In 793 the monastery was renovated after a period of decline by the Bishop of Mardin and Kfartuta, Mor Hananyo, who gave the monastery its current name.

The monastery was later abandoned and re-founded by the bishop of Mardin, John, who carried out important renovations and moved the see of the Syriac Orthodox Church here before his death on the 12th of July 1165. Therefore, From 1160 until 1932 it was the official seat of the patriarch of the Syriac Orthodox Church, after which it was moved first to Homs and in 1959 to Damascus. However, The Patriarchal throne and many relics are still located in the Monastery, as well as the Tombs of various Patriarchs.

“Three kilometres east of Mardin is the monastery of St. Ananias which, with interruptions, was the residence of the Syriac Orthodox patriarch of Antioch from 1166 to 1923. It is situated at the foot of a mountain that, like a Swiss Emmental cheese, is full of niches and caves, dug out by hermits who withdrew to live in them. Especially rigorous ascetics had themselves walled into their caves for years, or even their whole lifetime; novices from the nearby monastery would pass them water and a little food through a small hatch. If a hermit left his bowl untouched for 40 days, his death was assumed, and the stone wall was broken down. This was like an early, voluntary choice of one’s own grave, a custom that was also widespread in Buddhist Tibet up to the Chinese invasion of 1950. It was hermits like these that gave Tur Abdin its name. . . . I then visited the subterranean tomb of the monastery and found, in the seven room-size vaults, three Syriac Orthodox patriarchs and four archbishops buried seated on thrones in full regalia.”

The monastery has 365 rooms - one for each day of the year.

This monastery is the key reason to visit Mardin. In 451, the Miaphysite congregation of the Syrian Orthodox Church (Jacobites) split from the Byzantine Church after the Council of Chalcedon’s debate about the true nature of Christ. It served as the seat of the Syrian Orthodox church from 493 to the 1920s. The hardy Mardin Christian community has dwindled from 2000 to 200 over the past 30 years. The church still uses Aramaic, Jesus’ language, as its liturgical tongue. Services are held daily, led by one of the two remaining monks. To the right of the entrance, down a few steps is a prayer room originally used as a temple to Baal in 2000 B.C. Above it is an old mausoleum formerly used as a medical school; the wooden doors are inlaid with lions and serpents. The main chapel still retains patches of its original turquoise coat and houses a 300-year-old Bible, a 1000-year-old baptismal font, and a 1600-year-old mosaic floor.

Printing press 
The monastery has made a great effort to print books. A printing press was bought during a journey to England in 1874 and subsequently shipped to Antonius Azar in Aleppo. In 1881 the press was moved to the Monastery and in 1882 a separate house for the press was built. In the 1880s the archbishop of Jerusalem was sent to England to learn the printing. He came back with a second press as a backup for the first, which was located in Jerusalem. In 1888 the first book was printed in the monastery and a copy of the  first book was sent to Queen Victoria. In the Monastery books kept being printed until 1917. From 1913 to 1914 also a periodical named Hikmet was printed. In the Turkish Republic the printing press was used to print official documents as it was the only press in the region.

See also
Mount Izla
Syriac Orthodox Church

References

Sources

External links 

 
 Charity House
 Presentation
 Presentation

493 establishments
Christian monasteries established in the 5th century
Buildings and structures in Mardin Province
5th-century establishments in the Byzantine Empire
Syriac Orthodox monasteries in Turkey
Tur Abdin